The Next Indian general election in Punjab is scheduled to be held in or before May 2024 to elect the 13 members of 18th Lok Sabha.

Background

Parties and Alliances









Others

Candidates 
Keys:

Surveys and Polls

Opinion Polls

Exit Polls

See Also 
2022 Punjab Legislative Assembly election

References

Indian general elections in Punjab, India
Punjab